Adéwálé is both a given name and a surname of Yoruba origin, meaning "the crown or royalty has come home". Notable people with the name include:

Given name 
 Adewale Ademoyega (born c.1934), Nigerian Army officer
 Adewale Akinnuoye-Agbaje (born 1967), British actor and model
 Prince Adewale Aladesanmi (1938–2017), Nigerian businessman
 Adewale Sunday Amusan (born 1989), Nigerian footballer
 Adewale Ayuba (born 1966), Nigerian singer-songwriter
 Adewale Maja-Pearce (born 1953), Anglo-Nigerian writer, journalist and literary critic
 Adewale Ogunleye (born 1977), American football player
 Adewale Ojomo (born 1988), American football player
 Adewale Olukoju (born 1968), Nigerian discus thrower and shot putter
 Adewale Tinubu (born 1967), Nigerian businessman, consultant and lawyer
 Adewale Wahab (born 1984), Nigerian footballer

Surname 
 Segun Adewale (born 1955), Nigerian musician

Fictional characters 
 Adéwalé, a character in the video game series Assassin's Creed

See also 
 Adewole

References 

Yoruba given names
African masculine given names